The Great Deceiver is a band featuring At the Gates frontman Tomas Lindberg. Their music is a mixture of hardcore punk and heavy metal. The band was originally called Hide, and was formed in the week after At the Gates split up. A couple of years later they changed the name to The Great Deceiver.

In a 2020 interview with Decibel Magazine, Lindberg said that 'I will never forget about this band for an extended period of time again!”

Line-up

Current line-up
 Tomas Lindberg (vocals)
 Matti Lundell (bass)
 Johan Österberg (guitar)
 Ulf Scott (drums)
 Kristian Wåhlin (guitar)

Former members
 Hans Nilsson (drums)

Discography
 Cave In EP (Bridge, 1999)
 Jet Black Art EP (Trustkill, 2000)
 A Venom Well Designed (Peaceville, 2002)
 Terra Incognito (Peaceville, 2004)
 Life is Wasted on The Living (Deathwish Inc., 2007)

References

External links
 Official website Currently offline
 The Great Deceiver biography @ MusicMight

Swedish heavy metal musical groups
Deathwish Inc. artists
Industrial metal musical groups
Trustkill Records artists